Dutch courage, also known as pot-valiance or liquid courage, refers to courage gained from intoxication with alcohol.

History 

The popular story dates the etymology of the term Dutch courage to English soldiers fighting in the Anglo-Dutch Wars (1652–1674) and perhaps as early as the Thirty Years' War (1618–1648). One version states that jenever (or Dutch gin) was used by English soldiers for its calming effects before battle, and for its purported warming properties on the body in cold weather. Another version has it that English soldiers noted the bravery-inducing effects of jenever on Dutch soldiers.

Gin is a Dutch invention, and was first distilled in Holland in the 16th century. The flavouring in gin comes from juniper berries. The Dutch word for 'juniper' is 'jenever', which got Anglicised to 'ginever' and then finally to 'gin'. Gin would go on to become popular in Britain thanks to King William III of England (William of Orange), who was also Stadtholder of the Netherlands.

See also
Double Dutch
Dutch uncle
Going Dutch (a.k.a. Dutch treat, Dutch date)

References

Further reading 
 Discovery Channel's "How Do They Do It"
 Andrews, S (2007). "Textbook Of Food & Beverage Management", Tata McGraw-Hill (264).

English phrases
Etymologies
Anti-Dutch sentiment
Alcohol